RFA Green Ranger was a fleet support tanker of the Royal Fleet Auxiliary.

On 24 September 1946, Green Ranger was struck by a torpedo in Portland Harbour, Dorset. Although holed belowe the waterline, she remained afloat. She was wrecked on the Hartland peninsula, on a large rock, called Gunpath Rock, on 17 November 1962. She broke her tow from the tug that was taking her to be refitted in Cardiff, and drifted onto the rocks. Her skeleton crew of seven were rescued by the Hartland Lifesaving Company, with their breeches buoy. The ship became a total loss, and her remains are still visible at low tide.

References

Ranger-class tankers
Ships sunk with no fatalities
Maritime incidents in 1946
Maritime incidents in 1962
1941 ships
Ships built in Dundee